Marwahi is a village in Gaurella-Pendra-Marwahi district in the state of Chhattisgarh, India.

Demographics 
In the 2011 Census of India, the population was 4,060. 2,086 were males and 1,974 were females. The literacy rate was 83.84%, which was higher than the 70.28% figure for all of Chhattisgarh.

See also 
 Gaurella-Pendra-Marwahi district

References 

Villages in Gaurella-Pendra-Marwahi district